Cebuana Lhuillier Pawnshop (formerly known as Agencia Cebuana) commonly known as Cebuana, is a Philippine-based pawnshop and the flagship brand of PJ Lhuillier Group of Companies. Jean Henri Lhuillier is the current President and CEO of Cebuana.

Cebuana Lhuillier is a non-banking financial institution offering services such as pawn-broking, money remittance, insurance, bills payment, remit-to-account, corporate payout, collections, and e-loading. It is headquartered in Makati.

History
Cebuana Lhuillier Pawnshop began with four pawnshop outlets in Metro Manila in the mid-1980s.

In 1968, Philippe Jones Lhuillier, Henry Lhuillier's son, opened the first Lhuillier pawnshop at Libertad Street in Pasay under the trade name Agencia Cebuana.

It traces its roots to Cebu, where then-French Consul to the Philippines, Henry Lhuillier established his first chain of Agencias in 1935. Throughout the 70's and 80's, Philippe Jones Lhuillier opened more agencies in Metro Manila.

The company pursued further nationwide expansion in 1987 and adopted the trade name, “Cebuana Lhuillier.”

In 1998, Philippe Jones Lhuillier was appointed the Philippine Ambassador to Italy. Philippe Jones Lhuillier's son, Jean Henri Lhuillier, took the helm and became Cebuana Lhuillier Pawnshop's president and chief executive officer in the same year.

Jean Henri Lhuillier introduced Cebuana Lhuillier Pawnshop's auxiliary services remittance, insurance, bills payment, money changer, e-load, remit-to-account, corporate payout, and collections service.

It also became the first pawnshop and money remittance company to offer a membership rewards program for its clients in 2010. In the following year, Cebuana Lhuillier branches hit the 1,500 mark.  In 2014, the firm started to reach out to potential customers in areas with limited access through its Cebuana Lhuillier On Wheels.

Social Involvement

The firm owns several teams in the PBA D-League (Cebuana Lhuillier Gems), Metropolitan Basketball Association (Cebu Gems) & Philippine Basketball League (Lhuillier Jewelers). CL has also organised tennis tournaments such as Cebuana Lhuillier Age Group Tennis.

The firm's president, Jean Henri Lhuillier,  is the manager of the Philippine Davis Cup Team, Chairman of the Board of the Philippine Tennis Association (PhilTA), and also serves as the president of Amateur Softball Association of the Philippines  

The firm  has its own foundation, the Cebuana Lhuillier Foundation Inc., which conducts medical missions, relief operations for disaster-stricken areas, and feedings programs. It also has a nationwide scholarship program and Alternative Learning System community learning centers.

References

Cebuana Lhuiller Official Charge Rates
http://moneymanila.blogspot.com/2011/01/cebuana-lhuillier-pera-padala-ofw.html
https://web.archive.org/web/20111107154112/http://www.manilatimes.net/index.php/business/top-business-news/10203-cebuana-lhuillier-to-expand-network
https://web.archive.org/web/20160304040457/http://www.businessweekmindanao.com/2011/10/31/cebuana-lhuillier-targets-200-more-branches-by-next-year/
http://www.filipinoreporter.us/business-and-finance/investments/618-agent-cebuana-lhuillier-visits-moneygram-in-dallas.html
http://phildevfinance.posterous.com/cebuana-lhuillier-to-use-mobile-phones-for-re

http://computerworld.com.ph/tag/cebuana-lhuillier-pawnshops/
http://www.goldstardailynews.com/business/8347-get-more-benefits-from-new-cebuana-lhuillier-24k-card.html
http://chinabusinessphilippines.com/index.php?option=com_content&view=article&id=1284:cebuana-lhuilliers-isang-milyong-pasasalamat&catid=35:peopleevents&Itemid=129
http://www.zambotimes.com/archives/43571-Country146;s-largest-pawnshop-chain-launches-Happiest-Pinoy-2012-search-in-Davao-City.html
http://www.sunstar.com.ph/cebu/business/2012/02/29/insurance-firm-promotes-optimism-search-happiest-pinoy-208808
http://www.mb.com.ph/articles/352472/search-for-happiest-pinoy-launched
http://ramragandan.blogspot.com/2007/01/knowing-your-lhuilliers.html
http://www.unomagazine.com.ph/2010/05/king-of-pawn-jean-henri-lhuillier/
https://web.archive.org/web/20100604194145/http://lifestyle.inquirer.net/wellness/wellness/view/20100601-273141/How-sports-helps-Jean-Henri-Lhuillier-manage-his-bottomline
http://www.pages.ph/2008/05/a-cebu-gem-he-shines-in-rp-sports/
http://mimpss.wordpress.com/tag/jean-henri-d-lhuillier/
http://www.ofwngayon.com/tag/ambassador-philippe-j-lhuillier/
http://dfa.gov.ph/main/index.php/news-from-rp-embassies/712-ambassador-lhuillier-receives-italian-award

http://www.newsflash.org/2004/02/be/be004261.htm
http://www.balikbayanmagazine.com/index.php?option=com_content&view=article&id=239:a-good-man-with-a-good-heart-a-conversation-with-philippe-cebuana-lhuillier&catid=81:business

Pawn shops
Financial services companies established in 1988
Retail companies established in 1988
Companies based in Makati